The following lists events that happened during 1850 in Chile.

Incumbents
President of Chile: Manuel Bulnes

Events

Births
date unknown - Daniel Ortúzar (died 1932)
5 April - Ismael Tocornal (died 1929)
23 August - José Rafael Balmaceda (died 1911)
20 October - Sofanor Parra (died 1925)
16 November - Federico Errázuriz Echaurren (died 1901)

Deaths

References 

1850s in Chile
Chile
Chile